The 2015 Hamilton Tiger-Cats season was the 58th season for the team in the Canadian Football League and their 66th overall. The Tiger-Cats finished in 2nd place in the East Division with a 10–8 record and hosted a playoff game for the third consecutive season. The Tiger-Cats defeated the Toronto Argonauts in the East Semi-Final, but lost to the Ottawa Redblacks in the East Final, ending their quest to compete in three straight Grey Cups. This marked the first full season for the team playing at their new stadium, Tim Hortons Field. The Tiger-Cats played their first four games on the road due to stadium conflicts with the 2015 Pan Am Games. When they returned to their home field, they sold out all nine regular seasons games, which was the first time that the franchise had done that since 1973.

Offseason

CFL draft 

The 2015 CFL Draft took place on May 12, 2015. The Tiger-Cats had six selections in the seven-round draft, prominently trading away first and third round picks for Ryan Bomben hours before the draft. The club also traded their fifth round pick to the BC Lions for Seydou Junior Haidara and acquired an additional sixth round pick after trading Darcy Brown to Edmonton for Ricardo Colclough.

Preseason

Regular season

Season standings

Season schedule

Post-season

Schedule

Team

Roster

Coaching staff

References

Hamilton Tiger-Cats seasons
2015 Canadian Football League season by team